Hande Berktan is a Turkish TV presenter and journalist at Bloomberg HT.

Education and career

Berktan studied Business Administration and Management, General at Istanbul University, Turkey. She speaks German and English fluently.

She is currently presenting the program İş Dünyası every Monday and Friday at Bloomberg HT in Istanbul, Turkey.

See also
 List of people from Istanbul

References

External links
 

Turkish television presenters
Living people
Television people from Istanbul
Turkish television talk show hosts
Year of birth missing (living people)